Repi (Greek: Ρέπι) is a small Greek island off the east coast of Skiathos, Sporades, Greece. There is an abandoned settlement on the island.  It is administratively part of the municipality of Skiathos. , it had no resident population.

References

External links
Official website of Municipality of Skiáthos 

Landforms of the Sporades
Uninhabited islands of Greece
Skiathos
Islands of Thessaly